Poetic Pilgrimage is a British Muslim hip-hop duo, founded by Muneera Rashida and Sukina Abdul Noor in 2002.

Hip Hop Hijabis documentary
Hip Hop Hijabis is a 2015 Al Jazeera documentary about Poetic Pilgrimage, directed by filmmaker Mette Reitzel. The aim of the documentary is to educate a chosen demographic about the constraints of being female within the Hip Hop genre. Al-Jazeera called it "a universal story about friendship, love and idealism, and two young women finding their place in the world."

Discography

Press coverage
 New Statesman:
 Al-Ahram Weekly:
 The Independent:
 NRK (Norway):

References

2002 establishments in the United Kingdom
Living people
English hip hop groups
Performers of Islamic music
British Muslims
Converts to Islam
Black British musical groups
Musical groups established in 2002
All-female bands
Women hip hop groups
Year of birth missing (living people)